The Ward-Jackson House is a historic house at 122 North Louisiana Street in Hope, Arkansas.  The -story wood-frame house was built sometime in the 1890s, and is a particularly fine local example of Folk Victorian architecture.  It has a busy exterior typical of Queen Anne styling, including different types of cut shingles, and has a porch with turned-spindle balustrade, and an Eastlake-style frieze.  The windows are long and narrow, giving the house a somewhat Gothic appearance.

The house was listed on the National Register of Historic Places in 1989.

See also
National Register of Historic Places listings in Hempstead County, Arkansas

References

Houses on the National Register of Historic Places in Arkansas
Victorian architecture in Arkansas
Houses completed in 1893
Houses in Hempstead County, Arkansas
Individually listed contributing properties to historic districts on the National Register in Arkansas
National Register of Historic Places in Hempstead County, Arkansas